Lois Bancroft Long (December 15, 1901 – July 29, 1974) was an American writer for The New Yorker during the 1920s. She was known under the pseudonym "Lipstick" and as the epitome of a flapper.

She was born on December 15, 1901, in Stamford, Connecticut, the oldest of three children of Frances Bancroft and William J. Long. She graduated from Vassar College. Long had worked at Vogue and Vanity Fair before finding fame at The New Yorker. Harold Ross hired her to write a column on New York nightlife. Under the name of Lipstick, Lois Long chronicled her nightly escapades of drinking, dining, and dancing. She wrote of the decadence of the decade with an air of aplomb, wit, and satire, becoming quite a celebrity. Because her readers did not know who she was, Long often jested in her columns about being a "short squat maiden of forty" or a "kindly, old, bearded gentleman." However, in the announcement of her marriage to The New Yorker cartoonist Peter Arno, she revealed her true identity.

She remained with The New Yorker as a columnist until 1968. She died in 1974.

Biography

School years
Lois graduated from Stamford High School and entered Vassar College in 1918.  Already displaying a drive for literary excellence and exploration, she graduated from Vassar in 1922 with a degree in English.  In college, she began growing herself a modest reputation as a journalist, writing a review of "Vassar Dramatics" to the Poughkeepsie Courier in June of her senior year as well as participating as an editor in 1922's Vassarian.  In addition to making herself known through the school's written publications, Long occasionally participated in the institution's theatre program.

Personal life 
In 1927, cartoonist Peter Arno and Lois Long got married.  The marriage lasted four years, then in 1931 Long filed for divorce.  The divorce was granted and the two shared custody of their daughter, Patricia.

Career
As soon as she graduated from college, Long moved to New York and began making a name for herself. She started at Vogue and then went to Vanity Fair, but Long found her niche—and fame—when Harold Ross hired her for his new magazine, The New Yorker, a sophisticated humor magazine designed to appeal to New York City's elite. Even with that target audience, it (like most new publications) struggled financially in its early days; by May 1925, the astute Ross—looking for ways to increase readership—realized that Long was just the sort of writer who would. In the changing world of the 1920s, any truly modern magazine needed to appeal to both men and women, and the flapper—high-spirited, beautiful, independent, sexually open—did just that.

At 23, Long was paid to review the speakeasies of New York. Her witty, satirical column was called "When Nights are Bold," the title of which changed to "Tables for Two" with the issue for September 12, 1925 and ran until June 6, 1931. In addition to her observations on the patrons of speakeasies, it also included criticism of public officials, such as Manhattan District Attorney Emory R. Buckner, who conducted raids on speakeasies. As the archetypal flapper, Long's columns offered women a glimpse of a glamorous lifestyle where they could enjoy many of the same freedoms and vices as men. This new liberty was prompted by women gaining the right to vote in the United States in 1920 as well as the ways in which they defied the Victorian and Edwardian roles proscribed for women.

Her comment “I like music, and informality, and gaiety”  is the epitome of the flapper mindset and what some critics felt were the sexual and moral failings of flappers in the Roaring Twenties.

Different though they were, she and Ross managed to work together—and knew when, and how, to accommodate the other. Zeitz notes that Long's cubicle was originally on the other side of the building from her assistant, and after growing tired of running back and forth to exchange information, they made the trip on roller skates. In time, Ross grew exasperated and gave them offices next to one another to spare himself and the other journalists such antics.

Throughout her career, Long's work appeared in numerous formats, and in 1928, she was recruited by the editor and screenwriter, Gene Fowler, to contribute, along with Ben Hecht, Ring Lardner, Westbrook Pegler, and Walter Winchell, to The New York Morning Telegraph, and in 1936 Long was, for a short time, under contract to Paramount Pictures.

She was considered the expert on New York's nightlife. Upon her death, William Shawn, editor of The New Yorker said that "Lois Long invented fashion criticism," adding that she "was the first American fashion critic to approach fashion as an art and to criticize women's clothes with independence, intelligence, humor and literary style."

Later life

Long married US Air Force Major Harold A. Fox in 1957. Long died of lung cancer aged 72 and is buried in Easton Cemetery, Pennsylvania.

Bibliography

Articles

References

External links
 New York Times obituary
 Vassar Encyclopedia

1901 births
1974 deaths
Writers from Stamford, Connecticut
American columnists
The New Yorker people
Vassar College alumni
20th-century American non-fiction writers
Stamford High School (Stamford, Connecticut) alumni